Paola Vukojicic (born August 28, 1974) is a retired field hockey goalkeeper from Argentina, who won the silver medal with the national women's hockey team at the 2000 Summer Olympics in Sydney, the bronze medal at the 2004 Summer Olympics in Athens, Greece and at the 2008 Summer Olympics in Beijing, China, the World Cup in 2002, two Champions Trophy (2001, 2008) and two Pan American Games. She started playing the sport at San Isidro Club, and made her debut for Argentina in the 1998 World Hockey Cup in Utrecht.

External links
 
 

1974 births
Living people
Argentine female field hockey players
Female field hockey goalkeepers
Las Leonas players
Olympic field hockey players of Argentina
Field hockey players at the 2000 Summer Olympics
Field hockey players at the 2004 Summer Olympics
Field hockey players at the 2008 Summer Olympics
Argentine people of Serbian descent
Olympic silver medalists for Argentina
Olympic bronze medalists for Argentina
Olympic medalists in field hockey
Medalists at the 2000 Summer Olympics
Medalists at the 2004 Summer Olympics
Medalists at the 2008 Summer Olympics
Pan American Games gold medalists for Argentina
Pan American Games medalists in field hockey
Field hockey players at the 1999 Pan American Games
Field hockey players at the 2007 Pan American Games
Medalists at the 2007 Pan American Games
Medalists at the 1999 Pan American Games